A family secret is a secret kept within a family. Most families have secrets, but the kind and importance vary. Family secrets can be shared by the whole family, by some family members or kept by an individual member of the family. The secret can relate to taboo topics, rule violations or just conventional secrets. Issues like homosexuality, adultery, infidelity, divorce, mental illness; crime such as rape or murder; physical or psychological abuse, child sexual abuse, incest; sexual violence such as marital rape or pregnancy from rape; human sexual behavior like premarital pregnancy or teenage pregnancy; substance abuse including alcoholism. More simple secrets may be personality conflicts, death, religion, academic performance and physical health problems. Any topic that a family member thinks may cause anxiety may become a family secret. Family members often see keeping the secrets as important to keeping the family working, but over time the secrets can increase the anxiety in the family. The confidentiality of family secrets revealed by a patient is a common ethical dilemma for counselors and therapists.

References 

Family
Secrecy